Stitches is a 2011 Israeli short film directed by Adiya Imri Orr. It had its world premiere at the 2012 Tribeca Film Festival. The film was named a critics choice, and received the festival's 2012 Student Visionary Award.

Synopsis
Amit and Noa are life partners in their 30s. While in the hospital after the birth of their first daughter, the women finally tell the truth to each other.

Cast
 Riki Blich - Amit
 Itzik Golan - Shaul - Piper
 Shira Katznlanbogen - Noa

References

External links
 

2011 films
2011 drama films
2011 LGBT-related films
2010s Hebrew-language films
Israeli LGBT-related films
Israeli short films
Lesbian-related films
Student films
2011 short films
Israeli drama films